Mopac has the following meanings:
Missouri Pacific Railroad
Mopac Expressway, State Highway Loop 1 in Austin, Texas, U.S.
MOPAC, a computational chemistry program

Mayor's Office for Policing and Crime, a group which oversees the Metropolitan Police in London, U.K.
Mountain Pacific Curling Association, a regional curling association in the Western United States